Silvia Bolland is an American biomedical scientist serving as chief of the autoimmunity and functional genomics section at the National Institute of Allergy and Infectious Diseases. 

She earned a  Ph.D. in molecular biology from the University of Cantabria and received postdoctoral training at Harvard and Rockefeller University. Her areas of research include the identification of new genetic modifiers of systemic autoimmune disease, dose effect of Toll-like receptor genes and its role in autoimmune pathologies, and inhibitory signaling pathways mediated by the IgG Fc receptor (Fc gamma RIIB) and the phosphoinositol 5-phosphatase (SHIP).

Selected works

References 

21st-century American biologists
American women biologists
21st-century American women scientists
American medical researchers
Women medical researchers
National Institutes of Health people
Living people
Year of birth missing (living people)
Place of birth missing (living people)

University of Cantabria alumni